Alog  is a Norwegian musical group. 

The musical duo Alog was formed in Tromsø in Troms county, Norway in 1997. Alog has been among Norway's performers of experimental electronic music. 

The musical duo consists of Norwegian musicians Espen Sommer Eide and Dag-Are Haugan. The band records on the Rune Grammofon label, home of Norwegian artists mainly covering improv, electronica, jazz, avant rock and alternative pop. In 2005, Alog was the winner of the Spellemannprisen, the Norwegian equivalent of the Grammy.

Musical releases

Albums
Red Shift Swing (Rune Grammofon RCD 2011 • 1999)
Duck-Rabbit (Rune Grammofon RCD 2020 • 2001)
Catch That Totem! (1998-2005) (Meletronikk MLK013 •   2005) 
Miniatures (Rune Grammofon RCD 2043 • 2005)
Amateur (Rune Grammofon RCD 2063 • 2007)
Unemployed (Rune Grammofon RCD 2116 • 2011)

EPs
Islands of Memory (Creaked Records CRDS06 •   2006)

References

External links
Alog Official Site
 Rune Grammofon

Musical groups from Tromsø
Norwegian pop musicians
Norwegian electronic musicians
Rune Grammofon artists
Spellemannprisen winners